Skunk Run is a small tributary of Slippery Rock Creek in western Pennsylvania.  The stream rises in eastern Lawrence County at the Shenango and Slippery Rock Township line and then flows southeast entering Slippery Rock Creek in McConnells Mill State Park. The watershed is nearly 50% forested.

See also
 List of rivers of Pennsylvania

References

Rivers of Pennsylvania
Tributaries of the Beaver River
Rivers of Lawrence County, Pennsylvania